Jeronemus Johannes "Jeroen" Zweerts (born 3 February 1945) is a retired field hockey player from the Netherlands. He played seven matches and scored one goal at the 1972 Summer Olympics, where his team finished in fourth place. He was part of the Dutch team that won the World Cup in 1973.

Jeroen's elder brother Frank competed in field hockey at the 1964 Summer Olympics.

References

External links
 

1945 births
Living people
Dutch male field hockey players
Field hockey players at the 1972 Summer Olympics
Olympic field hockey players of the Netherlands
Sportspeople from Helmond
SCHC players